The 1980–81 Scottish Inter-District Championship was a rugby union competition for Scotland's district teams.

This season saw the 28th Scottish Inter-District Championship.

South won the competition with 3 wins.

1980-81 League Table

Results

Round 1

Edinburgh District: 

Glasgow District: 

North and Midlands: 

South:

Round 2

North and Midlands: 

Edinburgh District:

Round 3

South: 

Edinburgh District: 

Glasgow District: 

North and Midlands:

Round 4

South: 

Glasgow District:

Matches outwith the Championship

Other Scottish matches

Glasgow: 

Rest of the West:

South: 

Anglo-Scots:

Anglo-Scots: 

Edinburgh District:

Junior matches

Glasgow: 

South:

South: 

Midlands District:

Edinburgh District: 

Glasgow District: 

South: 

Edinburgh District:

Midlands District: 

Glasgow District:

Midlands District: 

Edinburgh District:

English matches

Durham County 'B': 

Edinburgh District 'B': 

Yorkshire: 

Edinburgh District: 

South of Scotland District: 

Durham County:

Irish matches

Connacht: 

Glasgow District: 

Irish Army: 

Glasgow District: 

Connacht: 

South of Scotland District: 

Leinster: 

South of Scotland District:

Welsh matches

Cardiff District: 

North and Midlands: 

Mid District: 

North and Midlands: 

Mid District: 

North and Midlands:

Australian matches

South of Scotland District: 

Queensland:

Trial matches

Blues: 

Whites:

References

1980–81 in Scottish rugby union
1980–81